Andrew Russell Garfield (born 20 August 1983) is an English and American actor. He has received various accolades, including a Tony Award, a BAFTA TV Award and a Golden Globe Award, in addition to nominations for a Primetime Emmy Award, a Laurence Olivier Award and two Academy Awards. Time included Garfield on its list of 100 most influential people in the world in 2022.

Born in Los Angeles and raised in Epsom, England, Garfield trained at the Royal Central School of Speech and Drama and began his career on the UK stage and in television productions. He made his feature film debut in the 2007 ensemble drama Lions for Lambs. He won the BAFTA TV Award for Best Actor for his performance in the television film Boy A (2007). He came to international attention in 2010 with the supporting role of Eduardo Saverin in the drama The Social Network, for which he received nominations for a BAFTA Film Award and a Golden Globe Award.

Garfield gained wider recognition for playing Spider-Man in the superhero films The Amazing Spider-Man (2012), The Amazing Spider-Man 2 (2014), and later in Spider-Man: No Way Home (2021). He received nominations for the Academy Award for Best Actor for starring as Desmond Doss in the war film Hacksaw Ridge (2016) and as Jonathan Larson in the musical Tick, Tick... Boom! (2021). Garfield also won a Golden Globe Award for Best Actor for the latter. In 2022, he starred as a Mormon detective in the crime drama miniseries Under the Banner of Heaven, earning nominations for a Primetime Emmy Award and a Golden Globe Award.

On stage, Garfield appeared in the 2012 Broadway revival of Death of a Salesman, which garnered him a Tony Award nomination. For playing Prior Walter in a 2017 London production of Angels in America, Garfield was nominated for a Laurence Olivier Award; he reprised the role on Broadway the following year and won the Tony Award for Best Actor in a Play.

Early life
Andrew Russell Garfield was born on 20 August 1983, in Los Angeles, California. His mother, Lynn (née Hillman), was from Essex, England, and his father, Richard Garfield, is from California. Richard's parents were also from the United Kingdom. Garfield's parents moved the family from the United States to the United Kingdom when he was three years old, and he was brought up in Epsom, Surrey. Garfield had a secular upbringing. He is Jewish on his father's side, and describes himself as a "Jewish artist." His paternal grandparents were from Jewish immigrant families who moved to London from Poland, Russia and Romania, and the family surname was originally "Garfinkel."

Garfield's parents ran a small interior-design business. His mother was also a teaching assistant at a nursery school, and his father became head coach of the Guildford City Swimming Club. He has an older brother who is an NHS doctor at Royal Brompton Hospital. Garfield was a gymnast and a swimmer during his early years. He had originally intended to study business but became interested in acting at the age of 16 when a friend convinced him to take theatre studies at A-level, as they were one pupil short of being able to run the class. Garfield attended Priory Preparatory School in Banstead and later City of London Freemen's School in Ashtead, before training at the Central School of Speech and Drama, University of London. His first job was at Starbucks, being moved between three separate establishments in Golders Green and Hendon.

Career

Early work and breakthrough (2004–2011)

Garfield began taking acting classes in Guildford, Surrey, when he was nine, and appeared in a youth theatre production of Bugsy Malone. He also joined a small youth theatre workshop group in Epsom and took theatre studies at A-level before studying for a further three years at a UK conservatoire, the Central School of Speech and Drama. Upon graduating in 2004, he began working primarily in stage acting. In 2004, he won a Manchester Evening News Theatre Award for Best Newcomer for his performance in Kes at Manchester's Royal Exchange Theatre (where he also played Romeo the year after), and won the Outstanding Newcomer Award at the 2006 Evening Standard Theatre Awards. Garfield made his British television debut in 2005 appearing in the Channel 4 teen drama Sugar Rush. In 2007, he garnered public attention when he appeared in the series three of the BBC's Doctor Who, in the episodes "Daleks in Manhattan" and "Evolution of the Daleks". Garfield commented that it was "an honour" to be a part of Doctor Who. In October 2007, he was named one of Varietys "10 Actors to Watch". He made his American film debut in November 2007, playing an American university student in the ensemble drama Lions for Lambs, with co-stars Tom Cruise, Meryl Streep, and Robert Redford. "I'm just lucky to be there working on the same project as them, although I don't really expect to be recognized later by audiences," Garfield told Variety in 2007. In his review for The Boston Globe, Wesley Morris considered Garfield's work "a willing punching bag for the movie's jabs and low blows".

In the Channel 4 drama Boy A, released in November 2007, he portrayed a notorious killer trying to find new life after prison. The role garnered him the 2008 BAFTA Award for Best Actor. Amy Biancolli of the Houston Chronicle wrote, "there is no doubt about the intelligence and sensitivity" of Garfield's portrayal. Minneapolis Star Tribune Christy DeSmith echoed Biancolli's sentiment, citing his "detailed expressions" as an example. Writing in The Seattle Times, John Hartl noted that Garfield demonstrated range in the role, and concluded: "Garfield always manages to capture his passion". Joe Morgenstern, the critic for The Wall Street Journal, dubbed Garfield's performance "phenomenal", assessing that he "makes room for the many and various pieces of Jack's personality". In 2008, he had a minor role in the film The Other Boleyn Girl, and was named one of the Shooting Stars at the Berlin International Film Festival. In 2009, Garfield held supporting roles in the Terry Gilliam film The Imaginarium of Doctor Parnassus and the Red Riding television trilogy. Kenneth Turan of the Los Angeles Times thought that Garfield gave a stand out performance in the latter.

In 2010, Garfield co-starred opposite Carey Mulligan and Keira Knightley in Mark Romanek's dystopian science-fiction drama Never Let Me Go, an adaptation of Kazuo Ishiguro's 2005 novel of the same name. He said of his character, Tommy D., "There's a sense of anxiety that runs through these kids, especially Tommy, because he's so sensory and feeling and animalistic, that's my perspective of him." Garfield was attracted to the film based on the existential questions the story expresses. He said the experience of being a part of Never Let Me Go was "just a dream to come true". He further remarked that the scenes in which his character—unable to contain his frustration—erupts with a wail, were "intense" for him. "I think those screams are inside all of us, I just got a chance to let mine out". For his portrayal of a well-meaning, but dim young man caught in a love triangle, he won the 2010 Saturn Award for Best Supporting Actor. Writing for Entertainment Weekly, Owen Gleiberman praised the performances of the lead cast, reflecting that "these three all act with a spooky, haunted innocence that gets under your skin." In comparison to Mulligan and Knightley, Scott Bowles, writing for USA Today, deemed Garfield "the real find" of Never Let Me Go.

The same year, Garfield co-starred opposite Jesse Eisenberg in The Social Network, a drama based on the founders of Facebook. On his character, Garfield remarked, "No one knows who Eduardo Saverin is, and I don't either. Of course, the fact he's a real-life human being, breathing on this Earth somewhere, creates a whole new dimension to my approach because you [sic] feel a greater sense of responsibility". Initially, the film's director, David Fincher, had met Garfield under the auspices of him playing Mark Zuckerberg, having been referred to him by Mark Romanek. However, Fincher did not like Garfield for the part as he found Garfield's "incredible emotional access to his kind of core humanity" better tailored for the role of Saverin. Garfield's performance was very well received; he earned wider recognition and numerous nominations, including BAFTA nominations for Best Actor in a Supporting Role and Rising Star, as well as a Golden Globe nomination for Best Performance in a Supporting Role. Mark Kermode of the BBC expressed his surprise that Garfield had been overlooked for an Academy Award nomination, opining that "everyone knows he's one of the very best things about The Social Network." Writing in The Wall Street Journal, Joe Morgenstern thought the role was portrayed with "great subtlety and rueful charm". Rolling Stone said Garfield delivered "a vulnerability that raises the emotional stakes in a movie", and proclaimed: "Keep your eyes on Garfield — he's shatteringly good, the soul of a film that might otherwise be without one."

Spider-Man and worldwide recognition (2012–2016)

Garfield was cast as Spider-Man/Peter Parker, opposite Emma Stone as his love interest Gwen Stacy, in Marc Webb's The Amazing Spider-Man (2012), a reboot of the Spider-Man film series. Garfield saw his casting as a "massive challenge in many ways", having to make the character "authentic" and "live and breathe in a new way". He described Peter as someone he could relate to and stated that the character had been an important influence on him since he was a child. For the role, he studied movements of athletes and spiders, and tried to incorporate them, and practiced yoga and pilates. The Amazing Spider-Man earned a worldwide total of $752,216,557, and Garfield's performance was generally well received. The Guardian Peter Bradshaw labelled his portrayal as the "definitive Spider-Man" and Tom Charity of CNN commended his "combination of fresh-faced innocence, nervous agitation and wry humor".

In March 2012, Garfield made his Broadway theatre debut as Biff Loman in the revival of Death of a Salesman. According to The New York Times David Rooney, Garfield had successfully "exposed the raw ache of Biff's solitude". Garfield was nominated for a Tony Award for Best Featured Actor in a Play for his performance. Two years later, Garfield hosted an episode of Saturday Night Live and appeared in a music video for the song "We Exist" by Arcade Fire, playing a trans woman. Also in 2014, he co-produced and starred in the 2014 independent drama 99 Homes and reprised the titular role in The Amazing Spider-Man 2. Following a deal between Sony and Marvel Studios to integrate the Spider-Man character into the Marvel Cinematic Universe, sequels to the latter film were scrapped, and the role was later taken on by Tom Holland in a reboot. Arachnologists Yuri M. Marusik and Alireza Zamani honored Garfield's portrayal of the role by naming a new species of crevice weaver spider, Pritha garfieldi, after him.

Following a year-long absence from the screen, Garfield had starring roles in two films of 2016, Martin Scorsese's drama Silence and Mel Gibson's war film Hacksaw Ridge. In the former, based on Shūsaku Endō's 1966 novel of the same name, Garfield played Sebastião Rodrigues, a Portuguese Jesuit priest in the seventeenth century who travels to Japan to spread his faith. Garfield spent a year with James Martin studying to be a Jesuit priest and went on a silent retreat in Wales. The film's arduous principal photography took place in Taiwan, and Garfield lost  to achieve his character's physicality. Kate Taylor of The Globe and Mail disliked the film and wrote that Garfield "is sweetly resolute and gently anguished as the missionary Rodrigues but any hope that the actor might elucidate the psychology of philosophical certitude or the pain of religious doubt proves vain". At the box office, it earned less than half of its $50 million budget. Hacksaw Ridge, however, was a commercial success, earning over $175.3 million worldwide. In it, Garfield portrayed Desmond Doss, a combat medic during World War II, who was the first conscientious objector in American history to be awarded the Medal of Honor. Writing for USA Today, Brian Truitt labelled the film as "brutally intense and elegantly crafted"; he believed that the central role allowed Garfield to bring depth to his career and commended him for portraying Doss with both "simple sweetness" and "steadfast mettle". He received a nomination for the Academy Award for Best Actor for Hacksaw Ridge.

Established career (2017–present)

Garfield played the role of Prior Walter in Tony Kushner's two-part play Angels in America at the Lyttelton Theatre in the National Theatre, London from April to August 2017, and the performance was broadcast live to cinemas around the world in summer 2017 through the National Theatre Live series. It was directed by Marianne Elliott and co-starred Nathan Lane, James McArdle, Russell Tovey, and Denise Gough. Paul T Davis of The British Theatre Guide wrote that Garfield was "transformative and unrecognisable in places, completely inhabiting camp, laconic, frightened and totally loveable Prior Walter". He was nominated for the Laurence Olivier Award for Best Actor.

Garfield's sole film release of 2017 was the biopic Breathe, in which he portrayed Robin Cavendish, a young man paralysed by polio. In preparation, he interacted with individuals who had polio and collaborated closely with Cavendish's wife and son. Stephen Dalton of The Hollywood Reporter wrote that despite an exceptional story, the film had glossed over the complexities in Cavendish's life, and thought that Garfield was "hampered by a role that restricts him to little more than nodding and grinning". In March 2018, Garfield reprised the role of Prior when the Angels in America production transferred to Broadway for an eighteen-week limited engagement at the Neil Simon Theatre, alongside a majority of the London cast. Reviewing the production for The Washington Post, Peter Marks remarked that "nothing [Garfield's] done prepares you for the star-powered dexterity of his Prior" and considered his performance to be the "persuasive moral core of the piece." He won the Tony Award for Best Actor in a Play for his performance.

The 2018 Cannes Film Festival marked the premiere of Garfield's next film, the David Robert Mitchell-directed neo-noir Under the Silver Lake. In it, he played Sam, an unemployed and wayward young man who sets out on a journey to find his neighbour who has mysteriously disappeared. Writing for Vanity Fair, Richard Lawson found Garfield to be "great in the role, doing nimble, subtle bits of physical comedy and teasing out the creepy, menacing side of Sam". Garfield starred in Gia Coppola's drama Mainstream, alongside Maya Hawke and Jason Schwartzman, which had its world premiere at the 2020 Venice Film Festival.

In 2021, Garfield starred in The Eyes of Tammy Faye opposite Jessica Chastain, a drama about the televangelists Tammy Faye and Jim Bakker, which had its world premiere at the 2021 Toronto International Film Festival. That same year, Garfield portrayed composer Jonathan Larson in Lin-Manuel Miranda's film adaptation of Tick, Tick... Boom!. Miranda had first seen Garfield performing on stage in Angels in America. Garfield, who had not professionally sung before, underwent vocal training in preparation for the role. The film was released on Netflix. For his performance, Garfield received the Golden Globe Award for Best Actor in a Motion Picture Musical or Comedy, and a nomination for the Academy Award for Best Actor. Despite issuing repeated public denials to the contrary, Garfield reprised his role as Spider-Man in the Marvel Cinematic Universe film Spider-Man: No Way Home, starring alongside his Spider-Man successor Tom Holland and predecessor Tobey Maguire. Garfield described his experience working on the film as "joyful", and said that it gave him "closure" with his version of the Spider-Man character. He also said that he would be open to reprising the role in future if it felt right.

In 2022, Garfield was included on Time magazine's annual list of 100 most influential people in the world. He starred in Dustin Lance Black's miniseries Under the Banner of Heaven, an adaptation of Jon Krakauer's book of the same name, that same year. Reviewing the miniseries, Vultures Kathryn VanArendonk highlighted Garfield's "almost flagrantly tender portrayal" of Jeb Pyre, a Mormon detective. His performance earned him a Primetime Emmy Award nomination for Outstanding Lead Actor in a Limited or Anthology Series or Movie.

Personal life
Garfield has referred to himself as an "agnostic pantheist", though he identifies as Jewish. Having completed the Spiritual Exercises of Ignatius of Loyola for playing a Jesuit in Silence, he said how "What was really easy was falling in love with this person, was falling in love with Jesus Christ. That was the most surprising thing."

Garfield has dual citizenship in the United States and the United Kingdom. In 2009, he told the Sunday Herald that he felt "equally at home" in both countries and enjoyed "a varied cultural existence". When asked again in 2019, he stated, "I identify more as Jewish than anything... I have a love-hate relationship with both countries and used to be very proud to have both passports. Today, I'm slightly less proud." Garfield's primary place of residence is in North London near Hampstead Heath. He told Shaun Keaveny on a podcast in 2021 that he considers England home as that is where his family and friends are.

Garfield customarily gives interviews about his work, but does not publicly discuss details of his private life. In 2011, Garfield began dating his The Amazing Spider-Man co-star Emma Stone sometime during production of the film. In 2015, they were rumoured to have broken up although no formal statement was released. When asked about his sexuality, Garfield identified himself as heterosexual but has stated "I have an openness to any impulses that may arise within me at any time."

Garfield's mother Lynn died of pancreatic cancer during his filming of The Eyes of Tammy Faye and shortly before Tick, Tick... Boom! began production. He was able to fly home to be there with her.

In 2011, Garfield became the Ambassador of Sport for the Worldwide Orphans Foundation.

Acting credits

Film

Television

Theatre

Discography

Awards and nominations

See also

 Pritha garfieldi, a spider named after Garfield

References

External links

1983 births
21st-century American male actors
21st-century English male actors
Alumni of the Royal Central School of Speech and Drama
American agnostics
American emigrants to England
American male film actors
American male radio actors
American male stage actors
American male television actors
American people of English descent
American people of English-Jewish descent
American people of Polish-Jewish descent
American people of Romanian-Jewish descent
American people of Russian-Jewish descent
Best Actor AACTA Award winners
Best Actor BAFTA Award (television) winners
Critics' Circle Theatre Award winners
English agnostics
English male film actors
English male models
English male radio actors
English male stage actors
English male television actors
English people of American-Jewish descent
English people of Polish-Jewish descent
English people of Romanian-Jewish descent
English people of Russian-Jewish descent
Jewish agnostics
Jewish American male actors
Jewish English male actors
Living people
Male actors from London
Male actors from Los Angeles
Male actors from Surrey
Male models from California
Pantheists
People educated at City of London Freemen's School
People from Epsom
People from Greenwich Village
Tony Award winners